Lajos Szentgáli (7 June 1932 – 2 November 2005) was a Hungarian athlete who competed in the 1952 Summer Olympics and in the 1956 Summer Olympics. He was born and died in Budapest.

References

1932 births
2005 deaths
Hungarian male middle-distance runners
Olympic athletes of Hungary
Athletes (track and field) at the 1952 Summer Olympics
Athletes (track and field) at the 1956 Summer Olympics
European Athletics Championships medalists
Athletes from Budapest
20th-century Hungarian people